The Minnesota North Stars were an American professional ice hockey team based in Bloomington, Minnesota, a city in the U.S. metropolitan statistical area of Minneapolis–Saint Paul. The team joined the NHL in 1967 as an expansion team with five other teams; the Cleveland Barons, another 1967 NHL expansion team, were merged with the North Stars in the 1978–79 season. The North Stars played in the Stanley Cup Finals twice: as the Prince of Wales Conference champions in the 1980–81 season, and in the 1990–91 season after winning the Clarence S. Campbell Bowl, but lost in both Finals. The North Stars played their home games at the Met Center. The team relocated to Dallas, Texas in 1993, after former owner Norman Green announced that he was moving the team to Dallas's Reunion Arena in search of a better economic situation, and are now known as the Dallas Stars. The North Stars played in the Norris Division of the Clarence Campbell Conference in the National Hockey League (NHL) in their last season. There were 16 head coaches for the North Stars team.

The North Stars' first head coach and general manager was Wren Blair, who coached for the first three seasons, and was the North Stars' general manager until 1974; Jack Gordon, Lou Nanne, and Bob Gainey were also the general manager of the North Stars during their tenures as head coach. Nine of the first twelve North Stars head coaches lasted less than two complete seasons, while ten of the first twelve head coaches have spent their entire NHL head coaching careers with the North Stars. Gordon was the first North Stars head coach to have coached more than two complete seasons, with four.

Several head coaches have had multiple tenures with the North Stars. Glen Sonmor served three terms as North Stars head coach. He is the North Stars' all-time leader for the most regular-season games coached, regular-season game wins, regular-season points, playoff games coached, and playoff-game wins. Sonmor's first term lasted five seasons, the longest duration for one North Stars head coach term; his last term lasted two games, which was the shortest tenure. Blair, Gordon and Charlie Burns each served two terms as the North Stars' head coach. None of their second terms were winning seasons.

Burns, Ted Harris, Parker MacDonald, Nanne, and Murray Oliver had once played for the North Stars; Burns is the only person to have been a player-coach for the North Stars, having done so in the 1969–70 season. 1980 U.S. Olympic "Miracle on Ice" coach Herb Brooks, who coached the North Stars in the 1987–88 season, is the only North Stars head coach to have been elected to the Hockey Hall of Fame as a builder; Harry Howell and Gainey were inducted as players. Sonmor and Gainey are the only head coaches to reach the Stanley Cup Finals with the North Stars, in the 1981 and 1991 Finals respectively. Gainey was the last head coach of the North Stars; he coached the franchise until the 1995–96 season.

Key

Head coaches

Head coaches with multiple tenures

Notes
 A running total of the number of coaches of the North Stars. Thus, any coach who has two or more separate terms as head coach is only counted once.
 Each year is linked to an article about that particular NHL season.

References
General

Specific

National Hockey League coaches by team
Head coaches